The Yap Soccer Association is the governing body of football (soccer) in the State (country subdivision) of the Federated States of Micronesia, consisting of the island of Yap. It organises the Yap football team.

External links 
Yap on www.fedefutbol.net
The Yap Soccer Association has elected their three delegates to attend the FSMFA General Meeting of Delegates

Soccer Association
Football in the Federated States of Micronesia
Sports organizations established in 1983